The Checklist of Fantastic Literature is a bibliography of English science fiction, fantasy and weird books compiled and edited by Everett F. Bleiler with a preface by Melvin Korshak and a cover by Hannes Bok.

With a print run of 1,933 copies, it was the first book from Shasta Publishers. The bibliography is nearly complete and lists over 5,000 titles published prior to 1949. The books are listed by author and indexed by title. Willy Ley described it as "indispensable to librarians, book dealers, and especially antiquarians."

Publication history
1948, US, Shasta Publishers , Pub date 1948, Hardback
1972, US, Fax Collectors Editions , Pub date 1972, Hardback
1978, US, Firebell Books , Pub date 1978, Hardback, revised as The Checklist of Science Fiction and Supernatural Fiction

References

1948 non-fiction books
American non-fiction books
Fantasy bibliographies
Books about books
Science fiction studies
Fantastic